Her Melody (Swedish: Hennes melodi) is a 1940 Swedish comedy film directed by Thor L. Brooks and starring Sonja Wigert, Sture Lagerwall and Margit Manstad. It was shot at the Sundbyberg Studios in Stockholm. The film's sets were designed by the art director Max Linder and Bibi Lindström.

Synopsis
Sonja and Curt meet in a taxi. Both believe the other is from the wealthy upper-classes and try to maintain the pretence.

Cast
 Sonja Wigert as Sonja Larsen
 Sture Lagerwall as 	Curt Strange
 Margit Manstad as 	Gloria
 Håkan Westergren as 	Wicander jr.
 Hilda Borgström as 	Sonja's Grandmother
 Marianne Aminoff as 	Gullan Karlsson
 Gösta Cederlund as 	Uncle Berglund
 Dagmar Ebbesen as 	Mrs. Lindenstjaerna
 Stig Järrel as 	Pelle Söderström
 Georg Funkquist as 	Department manager
 Torsten Winge as 	Mr. Lindenstjaerna
 Pierre Colliander as 	Ubbe
 Eivor Engelbrektsson as 	Inga
 Hilde Majfeldt as 	Maj
 Wiktor Andersson as Alexander, Lindenstjärna's driver 
 Gunnar Björnstrand as Miss Lindenstjärnas fiance
 Olga Andersson as 	Guest at Restaurang Bristol
 Gösta Bodin as Svensson at Wicander's 
 Carl Ericson as 	Driver
 Arne Lindblad as 	Tailor at Wicander's 
 Gustaf Lövås as Johan, Wicander's driver

References

Bibliography 
 Qvist, Per Olov & von Bagh, Peter. Guide to the Cinema of Sweden and Finland. Greenwood Publishing Group, 2000.

External links 
 

1940 films
Swedish comedy films
1940 comedy films
1940s Swedish-language films
Films directed by Thor L. Brooks
1940s Swedish films